The Benza RPG is a 2020 role-playing video game that takes place in the world of the Japanese on demand comedy series The Benza and its spin-off series Benza English. It was released in 148 countries via the iOS app store and shortly after on Steam and Android devices.  The plot takes place between Benza English and the second series of The Benza. The story and dialog were entirely written by series creator Christopher McCombs.

Gameplay
The player primarily takes control of Chris and Kyle as they explore a retro-rpg version of Higashi Nakano. Many locations and characters from The Benza and Benza English are featured within the game. Gameplay is divided between story, battle, and exploration. The combat system is turn based and features an on screen turn counter. The player also has the ability to swap characters in and out of battle at any time via the “Switch” battle command.

Plot
Chris (Christopher McCombs) and Kyle (Kyle Card) are about to head to the set for their first day of work on series 2 of The Benza when Inko Sensei (Haku Inko) appears. She uses a dark magic to turn all of Higashi Nakano into a retro RPG and kidnaps Lee. Chris and Kyle must battle through fifty floors of their Japanese school with their friends Alena (Janni Olsson), Stephanie (Hannah Grace), David (Alexander Hunter), and more to put a stop to Inko Sensei's evil plan.

Development
The Benza RPG was developed by indie game creator Guilherme Martins in collaboration with The Benza and Benza English’s production company Tokyo Cowboys. Development began in 2020. The Benza director Raito Nishizaka and cast member Aver Hamilton II (Hamilton) provided original art work along with Italian manga artist Caterina Rocchi and French artist Iris Benoit.

Series creator Christopher McCombs provided the story and the game dialog. He is quoted on the gaming news site TheGG as saying, “We realized while making series one in 2018 that The Benza and its world were perfect to turn into a video game.”

The game was formally announced in an article about Benza English on SoraNews by Christopher in June 2020.

Though initially released only with English language support, The Benza RPG was updated with Japanese language support and translation in June 2021.

Musical score
Twenty nine original songs were created for “The Benza RPG” by various artists, including Marcus L Spade Johnson and Yonamine Akinori. The Benza and Benza English Sound Producer - Takahiro Nomiya - oversaw sound production of the game. Six of the songs on the soundtrack were performed by the main cast.

Cast

The main cast from the original series The Benza returned to provide voice acting for The Benza RPG. Over 280 original lines of dialog were recorded for the game.

 Christopher McCombs as Chris
 Kyle Card as Kyle
 Haku Inko as Inko Sensei
 Michiko Noguchi as Za
 Masahito Kawahata as Tamura
 Hannah Grace as Stephanie
 Alexander Hunter as David
 Janni Olsson as Alena
 Min Lee Kuk as Lee
 Shizuka Anderson as Carol

Reception
The game has been received positively, with 4.9 stars on the Apple App Store and 5 stars on the Amazon Android App Store. The Metacritic user review score is 10. In regards to the game, pop-culture website SoraNews 24 said:

“Since this retro RPG is based on a comedy web series, there are also a ton of subtle and not-so-subtle jokes scattered throughout the characters’ dialogue. The quest is a serious one, but you'll have plenty of laughs along the way.”

Tokyo based news site Tokyo Weekender also notes:

“Just as the show wants to be a place where people can come together to share a laugh, the game has been created so that all gamers, be they beginner or veteran, can pick up and enjoy this turn-based RPG.”

References

External links
 
 

2020 video games
Android (operating system) games
IOS games
MacOS games
Role-playing video games
Japanese role-playing video games
Single-player video games
Video games developed in Japan
Windows games